Domaine de Rouville DGC is a private 18-hole (formerly 12-hole) disc golf course located at the Domaine de Rouville golf course, in Saint-Jean-Baptiste, Quebec. Designed in 2013 by Mark Doucette, Gabriel Rondeau, and Paul Belyea on the grounds of an unused 9-hole golf club, it is widely regarded as one of the top disc golf courses in Quebec.

Tournaments 
The course has hosted several PDGA-sanctioned events, including the 2019 Championnat Oasis and the 2018 Championnat Provincial de Disc Golf du Québec (CPDGQ), part of the 2018 Tournée Pro-Am Disc Golf series. A longer 18-hole layout, sometimes known as CPDGQ course, is set up temporarily on the grounds of the Domaine de Rouville for the Championnat Provincial de Disc Golf du Québec.

See also 
 List of disc golf courses in Quebec

References

External links 

 
 Official map
 Domaine de Rouville DGC on DG Course Review
 Domaine de Rouville on the PDGA course directory

Disc golf courses in Quebec